Bodo Sieber (born 10 January 1979) is a former German international rugby union player, playing for the University of Cape Town RFC and the German national rugby union team.

He started playing Rugby in 1993, having since played in Germany, Ireland and South Africa.

Having played in two U19 World Cups (Chile / France) and making his debut for the German National Team in 1998, Sieber left Germany in 2000 to join University of Cape Town RFC Ikey Tigers where he played 170 first class games. He played professionally for Cork Constitution in the AIB League in 2005-06. He played for Western Province in the Vodacom Cup for two seasons. He is an Exco member of the UCT Ikey Tigers Rugby Club.

Honours

Club
 German rugby union cup
 Winner: 1998

National team
 European Nations Cup - Division 2
 Champions: 2008

Stats
Bodo Sieber's personal statistics in club and international rugby:

National team

European Nations Cup

Friendlies & other competitions

 As of 3 March 2010

References

External links
 Bodo Sieber at scrum.com
  Bodo Sieber at totalrugby.de
  Bodo Sieber at the DRV website
 Interview with Bodo Sieber by Bobby Skinstad

1979 births
Living people
German rugby union players
Germany international rugby union players
SC Neuenheim players
Cork Constitution players
Rugby union locks
University of Cape Town alumni
German expatriate sportspeople in South Africa
German expatriate sportspeople in Ireland
Expatriate rugby union players in Ireland
Expatriate rugby union players in South Africa
German expatriate rugby union players